Dévoluy is a commune in the Hautes-Alpes department in Provence-Alpes-Côte d'Azur region in southeastern France. It is the result of the merger, on 1 January 2013, of the four communes of Agnières-en-Dévoluy, La Cluse, Saint-Disdier, and Saint-Étienne-en-Dévoluy.

SuperDévoluy, a ski resort, is part of the commune.

Population

Geography

Location 

At 18,637 hectares, it is the second-largest commune in the area, right behind Névache.

Terrain and Geology 
The town covers the entirety of the Dévoluy range.

Dévoluy is known for its numerous underground cavities, the chourums , and its suitability for speleology.

The European larch, or common larch (Larix decidua) is particularly present in the commune.

See also 

 Communes of the Hautes-Alpes department

References

Communes of Hautes-Alpes

Communes nouvelles of Hautes-Alpes
Populated places established in 2013
2013 establishments in France